Louis-Nicolas Clérambault (19 December 1676 – 26 October 1749) was a French musician, best known as an organist and composer. He was born, and died, in Paris.

Biography
Clérambault came from a musical family (his father and two of his sons were also musicians). While very young, he learned to play the violin and harpsichord and he studied the organ with André Raison. Clérambault also studied composition and voice with Jean-Baptiste Moreau.

Clérambault became the organist at the church of the Grands-Augustins and entered the service of Madame de Maintenon. After the death of Louis XIV and Guillaume-Gabriel Nivers, he succeeded the latter at the organ of the church of Saint-Sulpice and the royal house of Saint-Cyr, an institution for young girls from the poor nobility.  He was responsible there for music, the organ, directing chants and choir, etc. It was in this post—it remained his after the death of Madame de Maintenon—that he developed the genre of the "French cantata" of which he was the uncontested master. In 1719 he succeeded his teacher André Raison at the organs of the church of the Grands-Jacobins.

His Motet du Saint Sacrement in G major is one of the first French works known to have been performed in Philadelphia.

Works
His important published work includes:
a large number of religious pieces with chants and choirs, (motets, hymns, Magnificat, Te Deum etc.);
more than 25 secular cantatas on subjects often inspired by Greco-Roman myths;
sonatas for violin and basso continuo:
a book of dance pieces for the harpsichord (1704) in which he adopted the tradition of the unmeasured prelude;
a book of organ pieces in two suites (1710) in which melodic charm wins out over religious spirit. These two collections seemed destined to begin a cycle of pieces in all keys but Clérambault never completed the cycle.

By catalogue number

 1: Cantata Book I No. 1: L'amour piqué par une abeille
 2: Cantata Book I No. 2: Le jaloux
 3: Cantata Book I No. 3: Orphée
 4: Cantata Book I No. 4: Polyphême
 5: Cantata Book I No. 5: Médée
 6: Cantata Book I No. 6: L'amour et Bacchus
 7: Cantata Book II No. 1: Alphée et Aréthuse
 8: Cantata Book II No. 2: Léandre et Héro
 9: Cantata Book II No. 3: La musette
 10: Cantata Book II No. 4: Pirame et Tisbé
 11: Cantata Book II No. 5: Pigmalion
 12: Cantata Book II No. 6: Le triomphe de la paix
 13: Cantata: Le bouclier de Minerve
 14: Cantata: Abraham
 15: Cantata Book III No. 1: Apollon
 16: Cantata Book III No. 2: Zéphire et Flore
 17: Cantata Book III No. 3: L'isle de Délos
 18: Cantata Book III No. 4: La mort d'Hercule
 19: Cantata: La muse de l'Opéra
 20: Cantata Book IV No. 1: L'amour guéri par l'amour
 21: Cantata Book IV No. 2: Apollon et Doris
 22: Cantata: Le soleil, vainqueur des nuages
 23: Cantata Book V No. 1: Clitie
 24: Cantata Book V No. 2: Les forges de Vulcain
 25: Cantata: Les francs masçons
 26: Choeurs et intermèdes de l'idille de St Cyr
 27: Choeurs de l'idille de St Cyr sur le départ du roi
 28: Le triomphe d'Iris
 29: Le triomphe de la vertu, ou Hercule vainqueur des plaisirs
 30: Himne de Saint Louis
 31: Idille sur la naissance de Nôtre Seigneur de Moreau (arrangement)
 32: Le retour du printemps (lost)
 33: Daphnis et Sylvie (lost)
 34: Air à boire: Enfin nos voeux sont satisfaits in C major
 35: Air à boire: C'en est fait j'ai brisé ma chaîne in G major
 36: Air italien: Vuol parlar il mio cuore in F major
 37: Air à boire: Buveurs trop altérés in E minor
 38: Ariette: Hélas! La pauvre fille in E minor
 39: Air sérieux: Jugez de ma peine extrême in C minor
 40: Air à boire: Réparons l'honneur de la treille in C major
 41: Air à boire: Amis, le dieu du vin s'empresse in G major
 42: Canon: Vive le roi in C major
 43: Harpsichord Suite No. 1 en C major
 44: Harpsichord Suite No. 2 en C minor
 45: Prelude for harpsichord in G major
 46: Organ suite of the first tone
 47: Organ suite of the second tone
 48: Chaconne for violin, viola da gamba and continuo in A major
 49: Allemande for violin and continuo in A major
 50: Menuet en rondeau for violin and continuo in A major
 51: Sonata I in G major "L'anonima"
 52: Sonata II in G major "La félicité"
 53: Sonata III in B flat major "L'abondance"
 54: Sonata IV in F major "Symphonia"
 55: Sonata V in D major
 56: Sonata VI in C major "L'impromptu"
 57: Sonata VII in E minor "La magnifique"
 58: Motet pour le jour de Noël in A major
 59: Motet pour le dimanche de la quinquagezime in E minor
 60: Motet pour le lundy qui précède le caresme in A major
 61: Motet pour le mardy qui précède le caresme in D minor
 62: Motet de la Sainte Vierge in C minor
 63: Motet pour le roy in D minor
 64: Motet pour l'ascension in B flat major
 65: Motet du Saint Esprit in E minor
 66: Motet du Saint Sacrement in E minor
 67: Motet du Saint Sacrement in D major
 68: Motet du Saint Sacrement in G major
 69: Motet pour le bienheureux Vincent de Paul in A major
 70: Stabat mater in B flat major
 71: Motet pour Sainte Françoise in A minor
 72: Motet pour Saint Joseph in G major
 73: Motet pour le saint jour de pâques in F major
 74: Motet pour l'ascension in F major
 75: Motet pour la fête de la Sainte Trinité in F major
 76: Motet de Saint Jean Baptiste in G major
 77: Motet de Saint Roch in G major
 78: Motet pour le bienheureux Vincent de Paul in C major
 79: Motet pour les Saints Anges in F major
 80: Motet de Saint Denis in C minor
 81: Motet pour la fête de tous les saints in B flat major
 82: Motet pour les apostres in A minor
 83: Motet du Saint Sacrement in A minor
 84: Motet du Saint Sacrement in G major
 85: Motet du Saint Sacrement in F major
 86: Motet du Saint Sacrement in D minor
 87: Motet du Saint Sacrement in D major
 88: Motet de la Sainte Vierge in A major
 89: Motet de la Sainte Vierge in G minor
 90: Motet de la Sainte Vierge in G major
 91: Motet de la Sainte Vierge in D major
 92: Motet de la Sainte Vierge in C minor
 93: Motet de la Sainte Vierge pour le caresme in G minor
 94: Motet de la Sainte Vierge pour le tems de pasques in G major
 95: Motet de la Sainte Vierge in A major
 96: Motet de la Sainte Vierge in D minor
 97: Domine salvum in A minor
 98: Domine salvum in F major
 99: Cantique des anges in D major
 100: Antienne à la Sainte Vierge pour le temps pascal in G major
 101: Motet de Saint Benoit in G major
 102: Motet de Saint Bernard in G major
 103: Motet de Saint Michel in D major
 104: Antienne à la Sainte Vierge in G minor
 105: Motet de Saint Dominique in G major
 106: Motet du Saint Sacrement in F major
 107: Motet de Saint Jean l'Evangéliste in A major
 108: Motet de Saint Augustin in D minor
 109: Motet de la Sainte Vierge in C minor
 110: Motet du Saint Sacrement in A major
 111: Motet pour la fête de l'assomption in D major
 112: Motet de Saint Sulpice in D major
 113: Motet de Saint Pie in D major
 114: Salve regina in E minor
 115: Motet de Sainte Chantal in A major
 116: Miserere à 3 in G minor
 117: De profundis clamavi in D minor
 118: Ecce quam bonum in G major
 119: Dominus quis habitabit in A major
 120: Judica me Deus in G minor
 121: Exaltabo te Domine in A major
 122: Exultate Deo in G major
 123: Miserere in C minor
 124: Motet de la Sainte Vierge in G minor
 125: Conturbatus est spiritus meus in C minor
 126: Motet de Saint Jean Baptiste in D major
 127: Motet de la Sainte Vierge in F major
 128: Motet du Saint Sacrement in D major
 129: Motet de Saint Sulpice in G major
 130: Viderunt te aquae Deus in E minor
 131: Motet du Saint Sacrement in C minor
 132: Antienne à la Sainte Vierge in C major
 133: Motet du Saint Sacrement in F major
 134: Motet du Saint Sacrement in A minor
 135: Motet de la Sainte Vierge in D minor
 136: Magnificat à trois parties in F major
 137: Te Deum in A minor
 138: Te Deum in C major
 139: Dixit Dominus in E minor
 140: Regina caeli in F major
 141: Exultate Deo in D major
 142: Audite gentes in D major
 143: Motet pour le sacré coeur de Jésus in A major
 144: Motet pour la nativité de Saint Jean Baptiste in G major
 145: Motet pour Saint Sulpice in A major
 146: Motet pour le roy, la reine et le dauphin in A major
 147: Pseaume 28 in C major
 148: Motet de Saint Sulpice in D major
 149: Motet pour la dédicace de l'eglise de Saint Sulpice in D major
 150: Motet pour la canonisation de Saint Pie in G major
 151: Motet de Saint Sulpice in B flat major
 152: Motet pour le roy in B flat major
 153: Pseaume 121 in C major
 154: Magnificat à trois parties in D minor
 155: Te Deum à trois parties in C major
 156: Motet du Saint Sacrement in A major
 157: Motet pour le roy in A major
 158: Motet pour le roy in G minor
 159: Motet pour le roy in E minor
 160: Stabat mater in B flat major
 161: Exaudiat in D minor
 162: Exaudiat in F major
 163: O sacrum convivium in A major
 164: Tantum ergo in A minor
 165: O salutaris hostia in E minor
 166: Adoramus te Christe in A minor
 167: Pie Jesu in C minor
 168: Litanies du sacré coeur de Jésus in C major
 169: Vovete et redite in G major
 170: Salve regina in D minor
 171: Motet pour la fête de la Sainte Trinité in G major
 172: Motet de Saint Augustin in F major (Nivers arr. Clérambault)
 173: O salutaris in A major (Nivers arr. Clérambault)
 174: Motet du Saint Sacrement in D major (Nivers arr. Clérambault)
 175: Motet du Saint Sacrement in G minor (Nivers arr. Clérambault)
 176: Motet du Saint Sacrement in A major (Nivers arr. Clérambault)
 177: Motet de la Sainte Vierge in A major  (Nivers arr. Clérambault)
 178: Motet de la Sainte Vierge in A major  (Nivers arr. Clérambault)
 179: Motet de la Sainte Vierge in D major  (Nivers arr. Clérambault)
 180: Motet de la Sainte Vierge in A major  (Nivers arr. Clérambault)
 181: Motet de la Sainte Vierge in D major  (Nivers arr. Clérambault)
 182: Motet de la Sainte Vierge in F major (Nivers arr. Clérambault)
 183–188: 6 Leçons de ténèbres (lost)
 189: O Filii (lost)
 190: Laudemus cantemus (lost)
 191: L'histoire de la femme adultère
 192: Air spirituel: Vertus – Misères du pêché in C minor
 193: Air spirituel: Stance in A minor
 194: Air spirituel: Vertus – La résignation in F major
 195: Air spirituel: Le paradis in A major
 196: Airs spirituels: Louanges de Dieu in E minor
 197: Air spirituel: Mistères de Notre Seigneur J.C. – Moment in B flat major
 198: Air spirituel: Mistères de Notre Seigneur J.C. – Sa résurrection in B flat major
 199: Air spirituel: Vertus – Amour de la sagesse in C minor
 200: Air spirituel: Noël in G major
 201: Air spirituel: Vertus – L'innocence in G major
 202: Air spirituel: Cantique de Saint Bernard in G major
 203: Air spirituel: Vertus – L'education in G minor
 204: Air spirituel: Vertus – Respect dans le lieu saint in A minor
 205: Air spirituel: Noël in A major
 206: Air spirituel: Cantique in A minor
 207: Airs spirituels: Vices – Le libertinage in D minor
 208: Air spirituel: Sonnet de Des Barreaux in D minor
 209: Air spirituel: Vertus – La confiance in G minor
 210: Air spirituel: Vertus – La sagesse in E minor
 211: Air spirituel: Cantique de Saint Bernard in C major
 212: Airs spirituels: Louanges de Dieu in B flat major
 213: Airs spirituels: Mistères de Notre Seigneur J.C. – Sa circoncision in G major
 214: Airs spirituels: Les IV fins de l'homme – L'impie détrompé in B flat major
 215: Air spirituel: Les IV fins de l'homme – Fuite du tems in G major
 216: Air spirituel: Vertus – Prière dans la tentation in G minor
 217: Air spirituel: Stance – Mon coeur est accablé in G major
 218: Air spirituel: Ne cherchons plus que Dieu in G major
 219: Air spirituel: Stance – N'espérons plus mon âme in D minor
 220: Air spirituel: Stance – Objets lugubres et funèbres in D minor
 221: Air spirituel: Sur les O de Noël – O sapientia in D minor
 222: Air spirituel: Sur les O de Noël – O adonai in D major
 223: Air spirituel: Sur les O de Noël – O radix Jesse in F major
 224: Air spirituel: Sur les O de Noël – O clavis David in F major
 225: Air spirituel: Sur les O de Noël – O oriens in G major
 226: Air spirituel: Sur les O de Noël – O rex gentium in G major
 227: Air spirituel: Sur les O de Noël – O Emmanuel in E minor
 228: Air spirituel: O vive flamme in A major
 229: Airs spirituels: Mistères de Notre Seigneur J.C. – Son incarnation in G major
 230: Air spirituel: Stance – Pour un pécheur in C minor
 231: Airs spirituels: Les IV fins de l'homme – La mort in B minor
 232: Air spirituel: Stance – Quand je pense au Seigneur in G major
 233: Air spirituel: Mistères de Notre Seigneur J.C. – Sa mort in F major
 234: Air spirituel: Vices – L'oisiveté in A major
 235: Air spirituel: Sur les désirs de la mort in C minor
 236: Air spirituel: Les IV fins de l'homme – Le paradis in A major
 237: Air spirituel: Désir de la mort in B flat major
 238: Air spirituel: Stance – Vous me cherchez Seigneur in D minor
 239: Règles d'accompagnement

See also

French organ school

References

External links

1676 births
1749 deaths
French Baroque composers
Composers for pipe organ
French male classical composers
French classical organists
French male organists
Musicians from Paris
18th-century keyboardists
18th-century classical composers
French harpsichordists
18th-century French composers
18th-century French male musicians
17th-century male musicians
Male classical organists